Cyclopropyl cyanide is an organic compound consisting of a nitrile group as a substituent on a cyclopropane ring. It is the smallest cyclic compound containing a nitrile.

Structure
The structure of cyclopropyl cyanide has been determined by a variety of experiments, including microwave spectroscopy, rotational spectroscopy and photodissociation. In 1958, cyclopropyl cyanide was first studied for its rotational spectra, by Friend and Dailey. Additional experiment involving cyclopropyl cyanide was the determination of the molecular dipole moment through spectroscopy experiments, by Carvalho in 1967.

Production 
Cyclopropyl cyanide is prepared by reaction of 4-chlorobutyronitrile with a strong base, such as sodium amide in liquid ammonia.

Reactions
Cyclopropyl cyanide, when heated to 660-760K and under pressure of 2-89torr, becomes cis and trans crotonitrile and allyl cyanide molecules, with some presence of methacrylonitrile. This is an isomerization reaction that is homogeneous with rate of first order. The reaction result is due to the biradical mechanism, involving the formation of carbon radicals as the three carbon ring opens up. The radicals then react to yield carbon=carbon double bonds.

References

Spectroscopy
Cyclopropyl compounds
Nitriles